This article lists power stations in Egypt.

Gas

Cairo Electricity Production Company

East Delta Electricity Production Company

Middle Delta Electricity Production Company

West Delta Electricity Production Company

Upper Egypt Electricity Production Company

Hydroelectric

Nuclear

Oil- and gas-fired thermal

Solar

Wind

New and Renewable Energy Authority

See also 

Energy policy in Egypt
Electricity in Egypt
List of largest power stations in the world
List of power stations in Africa

References 

Egypt
Power stations in Egypt
Power stations